Phyllis Dagmar Drummond Bethune (née Sharpe; 27 February 1899 – 12 December 1982) was a New Zealand artist.

Work by Bethune is held in the collection of the Dunedin Public Art Gallery and she helped form several New Zealand art societies.

Education 
Bethune was educated at the Canterbury College School of Art (now Ilam School of Fine Arts) under Cecil Kelly, Richard Wallwork, and A. F. Nicholl. Her contemporaries included Ngaio Marsh, James Cook, Evelyn Page, and Olivia Spencer Bower.

Career 
Bethune was a landscape painter, primarily based in the South Canterbury region of New Zealand.

Bethune was involved in New Zealand art societies including as a committee member of the South Canterbury Art Society, the formation of an art society in Waimate, and founding the Wānaka Art Group.

Exhibitions 
Bethune exhibited with:
 Auckland Society of Arts between 1949 and 1956
 Canterbury Society of Arts (under the name Bethune and Sharpe) in 1959
 South Canterbury Art Society between 1953 and 1964
 New Zealand Academy of Fine Arts (under the name Bethune and Sharpe)
 Otago Art Society (under the name Sharpe)
 Aigantighe Art Gallery in 1972
From 1936 to 1947 she was a member of The Group and exhibited with them in 1935 (under the name Sharpe); 1936; 1938; 1940; 1943; 1947.

Personal life 
She married John Bethune in October 1935 in Woodbury, Canterbury, New Zealand. She moved to Wānaka later in life, and died there in 1982.

References

Further reading 
Artist files for Phyllis Drummond Bethune are held at:
 E. H. McCormick Research Library, Auckland Art Gallery Toi o Tāmaki
 Hocken Collections Uare Taoka o Hākena
Also see:
 Concise Dictionary of New Zealand Artists McGahey, Kate (2000) Gilt Edge

1899 births
1982 deaths
New Zealand painters
Ilam School of Fine Arts alumni
People from Woodbury, New Zealand
People from Wānaka
People associated with the Canterbury Society of Arts
New Zealand women artists
People associated with the Auckland Society of Arts
People associated with The Group (New Zealand art)